The 1976 Iowa State Senate elections took place as part of the biennial 1976 United States elections. Iowa voters elected state senators in 28 of the state senate's districts—the 25 even-numbered state senate districts and special elections in districts 11, 15, and 41. State senators serve four-year terms in the Iowa State Senate, with half of the seats up for election each cycle. A statewide map of the 50 state Senate districts in the year 1976 is provided by the Iowa General Assembly here.

The primary election on June 8, 1976 determined which candidates appeared on the November 2, 1976 general election ballot. Primary election results can be obtained here. General election results can be obtained here.

To take control of the chamber from Democrats, the Republicans needed to net 2 Senate seats.

Democrats maintained their control of the Iowa State Senate following the 1976 elections with the balance of power remaining unchanged with Democrats holding 26 seats and Republicans having 24 seats after the election.

Summary of Results
NOTE: Districts not having elections in 1976 are unlisted.

Source:

Detailed Results
Reminder: All even-numbered Iowa Senate seats were up for election in 1976, as well as three odd-numbered districts (11, 15, & 41). All other odd-numbered districts did not have elections.

Note: If a district does not list a primary, then that district did not have a competitive primary (i.e., there may have only been one candidate file for that district).

District 2

District 4

District 6

District 8

District 10

District 11

District 12

District 14

District 15

District 16

District 18

District 20

District 22

District 24

District 26

District 28

District 30

District 32

District 34

District 36

District 38

District 40

District 41

District 42

District 44

District 46

District 48

District 50

See also
 United States elections, 1976
 United States House of Representatives elections in Iowa, 1976
 Elections in Iowa

References

1976 Iowa elections
Iowa Senate elections
Iowa State Senate